Yosimar Reyes (born September 22, 1988) is a Mexican-born poet and activist. He is a queer  undocumented immigrant who was born in Guerrero, Mexico and raised in East San Jose, California. Reyes has been described as "a voice that shines light on the issues affecting queer immigrants in the U.S. and throughout the world."

Reyes centers queer, working class, and immigrant themes in his work. He has been a guest speaker at numerous universities, community organizations, and cultural institutions including Stanford University, UCLA, Princeton University, the San Francisco Public Library, the Park Avenue Armory, the Aspen Institute, the University of Pennsylvania, Harvard University, and the North American Literary and Cultural Studies department at Saarland University in Germany.

From 2016 to 2018, Reyes served as Arts Fellow at Define American, a media and culture organization founded by Pulitzer Prize-winning journalist Jose Antonio Vargas which "uses the power of stories to [...] shift the conversation around immigrants, identity and citizenship in a changing America." He also previously served as Public Programs Coordinator at La Galería de la Raza in San Francisco.

Early life and education

Reyes was born on September 22, 1988 in Atoyac de Álvarez, Guerrero, Mexico. At age 3, he migrated to the United States with his family. Raised in East San Jose, he came out to his family and community at the age of 16.

Reyes attended Latino College Preparatory Academy, where he was awarded his high school diploma in 2006.  After briefly attending Evergreen Valley College, he received a Bachelor of Arts in Creative Writing from San Francisco State University in 2015.

Career

Reyes began performing his poetry at 16 years old upon realizing the power of language after being called “joto,” a derogatory Spanish term used to refer to gay men.

Reyes' first publication was the result of his winning first place in a writing competition in San Jose. At age 17, he won the title for the 2005 South Bay Teen Grand SLAM Champion, repeating his win in 2006. In 2007, he was featured in a Youth Speaks documentary titled 2nd Verse: the Rebirth of Poetry.

In 2009, he self-published his first chapbook, For Colored Boys Who Speak Softly, which garnered national and international acclaim. Musicians Carlos Santana and Harry Belafonte were early champions of Reyes' work.

He has been anthologized in the collections Mariposas: A Modern Anthology of Queer Latino Poetry (Floricanto Press); Queer in Aztlán: Chicano Male Recollections of Consciousness and Coming Out (Cognella Press); and Joto: An Anthology of Queer Xicano & Chicano Poetry (Kórima Press), and Somewhere We Are Human: Authentic Voices on Migration, Survival, and New Beginnings (HarperCollins). He and his work have also been featured in The Atlantic, the Huffington Post, Medium, Remezcla, VICE, and Teen Vogue.

In June 2016, Reyes premiered a solo staged reading of Prieto, his first autobiographical play, in collaboration with Guerrilla Rep Theater, Galería de la Raza, and Define American. In Prieto, Reyes recounts his younger self's understanding of his dual queer and undocumented identity. Prieto premiered at the Brava Theater in San Francisco in September 2022 and later toured to Movimiento de Arte y Cultura Latino Americana (MACLA) in San Jose.

Reyes was awarded an Undocupoets fellowship by Sibling Rivalry Press in 2017 and an Emerging Writers' fellowship in playwriting by Lambda Literary in 2018. Reyes' poem "Paisa" was featured in the eponymous short film directed by Dorian Wood and Graham Kolbeins in 2019.

During the 2020 COVID-19 pandemic, Reyes launched his virtual #YosiBookClub and IG Live Writers' Series wherein he interviews prominent Latino authors in an effort to demystify the creative process. Among interviewees have been celebrated Mexican-American journalist Maria Hinojosa, playwright and USC professor Luis Alfaro, Vida TV series creator Tanya Saracho, National Book Award finalist Kali Fajardo-Anstine, BuzzFeed contributor Curly Velasquez, former Goldman Sachs executive Julissa Arce, and noted poets Yesika Salgado, Karla Cornejo Villavicencio, Walter Thompson-Hernández, and Javier Zamora.

In addition to his literary practice, Reyes has curated or participated in multidisciplinary art exhibitions, including Homegirrlz: Demos and Remixes, Migrating Sexualities: Unspoken Stories of Land, Body and Sex, We Never Needed Papers to Thrive, #UndocuJoy, In Plain Sight and Creatives in Place. In 2020, Reyes was awarded a $25,000 Catalyst for Change grant from the National Association of Latino Arts and Cultures (NALAC) to undertake Writing Home, a collaboration with 15 undocumented artists and advocacy organizations that "seek[s] to shift the public, citizen imagination around undocumented individuals." In 2021, he was the recipient of a $10,000 MACLA Cultura Power Fellowship, which supports "Latinx artists who are actively working to advance a more just and equitable society through their art making practices." In 2022, the San José Museum of Art acquired Yosi con Abuela, a portrait of Reyes and his grandmother by artist rafa esparza, for its permanent collection. 

As a co-founder of La Maricolectiva, a grassroots performance community, Reyes created a platform for queer, undocumented poets and creatives. He is also associated with DreamersAdrift.

In solidarity with the 2020 Black Lives Matter protests, Reyes educated the US Latino and undocumented communities on anti-blackness and systematic racism in Spanish via Univision and radio programs.

Reyes has been recognized as one of "13 LGBT Latinos Changing the World" by The Advocate as well as a member of the OUT100 by Out Magazine.

Bibliography
 [Anthologized in] Xavier, Emanuel. MARIPOSAS: A Modern Anthology of Queer Latino Poetry. Floricanto Press. 2008. Print.
 Reyes, Yosimar. For Colored Boys Who Speak Softly, Self-Published, 2009. Print.
 [Anthologized in] Pinate, Marc David. La Lunada: An Anthology. CreateSpace Independent Publishing. 2010. Print.
 [Anthologized in] Del Castillo, Adelaida R, and Guido Gibran. Queer In Aztlan: Male Recollections of Consciousness and Coming Out, Cognella Academic Publishing, 2013. Print.
[Anthologized in] King, Nia. Queer and Trans Artists of Color: Stories of Some of Our Lives. CreateSpace Independent Publishing. 2014. Print.
[Anthologized in] HerrerayLozano, Lorenzo. Joto: An Anthology of Queer Xicano & Chicano Poetry. Korima Press. Forthcoming. Print.
[Anthologized in]  R., D. C. A., & Güido, G. (2021). Fathers, fathering, and Fatherhood: Queer Chicano/Mexicano Desire and belonging. Palgrave Macmillan.
Prieto. By Yosimar Reyes. Dirs. Kat Evasco, Sarita Ocón. Galería de la Raza, San Francisco. 16–18 June 2016.

References

1988 births
Living people
Immigrant rights activists
Mexican artists
Writers from San Jose, California
San Jose State University alumni
Mexican gay artists
Queer artists
Queer men
Undocumented immigrants to the United States